{{DISPLAYTITLE:C4H5NO2}}
The molecular formula C4H5NO2 (molar mass: 99.09 g/mol, exact mass: 99.0320 u) may refer to:

 Succinimide
 Azirinomycin

Molecular formulas